Ming is the Mandarin pinyin and Wade–Giles romanization of the Chinese surname written  in Chinese character. Ming is listed 111th in the Song dynasty classic text Hundred Family Surnames. It is not among the 300 most common surnames in China, according to a 2008 study. However, according to a 2013 study it was found to be the 249th most common, being shared by 340,000 people or .026% of the population, with the province with the most being Hubei.

Unrelated to the Chinese surname, Ming is also a common surname in Switzerland, originating in the Canton of Obwalden.

Notable people
 Ming Chongyan (明崇俨; died 679), Tang dynasty official
 Ming Yuzhen (1331–1366), Yuan dynasty rebel leader, self-proclaimed Emperor of Xia
 Ming Sheng (明升; 1356–1391), son of Ming Yuzhen, exiled to Korea after Xia was conquered by the Ming dynasty
 Ming Ji  (1923–2012), Taiwanese general and filmmaker
 Ming Jincheng (明金城), Taiwanese actor and director
 Ming Kai, better known as Clearlove, Chinese professional League of Legends player
 Ming Tian (born 1995), Chinese professional footballer

See also
 Hoyt Ming (1902–1985), American fiddler from Mississippi

References

Individual Chinese surnames
Swiss-German surnames